Kenneth Brown (born 9 June 1967) is a South African former cricketer. He played in one List A and two first-class matches from 1984/85 to 1992/93.

References

External links
 

1967 births
Living people
South African cricketers
Border cricketers
Griqualand West cricketers
People from Queenstown, South Africa
Cricketers from the Eastern Cape